IMF is an audio file format created by id Software for the AdLib sound card for use in their video games. The default filename extension is also "imf". The abbreviation stands for "id music file" or "id's music format".

The format is similar to MIDI, in that it defines musical notes, and does not support sampled digital audio for sound effects. IMF files store the actual bytes sent to the AdLib's OPL2 chip, which uses FM synthesis to produce audio output. The format is based on the AdLib command syntax, with a few modifications. Due to the limited features and relatively low sound quality, modern games no longer use IMF music.

Once extracted from a game, IMF files can be played with special sound libraries which emulate AdLib cards. One of the most popular ones is AdPlug, which can be used, for instance, through its Winamp plugin.

Games 
A large number of songs in id Software's games were composed by Bobby Prince in IMF format. Besides id Software, some other game developers like Apogee Software also used this format to add music to their games. Games using IMF music include: Bio Menace, Blake Stone: Aliens of Gold, Blake Stone: Planet Strike, Catacomb 3-D, Commander Keen 4-6, Corridor 7, Cosmo's Cosmic Adventure, Duke Nukem II, Major Stryker, Monster Bash, Operation Body Count, Spear of Destiny, and Wolfenstein 3D.

External links 
 AdPlug, library that supports the IMF file format
 IMF Format at ModdingWiki, including detailed information on the format
 AdPlug Decoder add-on for Foobar2000

Video game music file formats
Music notation file formats